Rademacher  is an indie rock band from Fresno, California. They have toured the West
Coast with bands including Silversun Pickups, The Joggers, Earlimart, and Man Man.  They released three EPs between 2004 and 2006, as well as their first full-length album in December 2007. The final disc of their three-album Baby Hawk trilogy was released on March 6, 2012.

Rademacher was featured in Billboard magazine under the heading: "Unsigned artists with the potential to break into the big time."  Rademacher's music was also featured on the television show Icons which airs on the G4 network.

The band released their first full-length album, Stunts, on December 4, 2007. The album was recorded at The Ship studios in Eagle Rock, and produced by their friend Aaron Espinosa of Earlimart. To promote their new album, Rademacher set up live show residencies in San Francisco, Fresno and Los Angeles, as well as a "blog-idency", where the band made their songs from the new album available on four different LA-area music blogs. This approach gained the band notoriety from various music journals, like CMJ and  Spin Magazine.

Discography
Rademacher EP - 2004 - Independent Release
Ice Age EP - 2005 - Independent Release
Heart Machine EP - 2006 - Independent Release
Stunts - 2007 - Independent Release
ERA EP - 2008 - Independent Release
Bellyflop EP - 2009 - Independent Release
Baby Hawk (Part I of III) - 2011 - Independent Release
Baby Hawk (Part II of III) - 2011 - Independent Release
Baby Hawk (Part III of III) - 2012 - Independent Release

References

External links
Official website

Indie rock musical groups from California
Culture of Fresno, California